John Elliot may refer to:

John Elliot (antiquary) (1725–1782), English antiquary
John Elliot (Royal Navy officer) (1732–1808), Royal Navy admiral, MP, and Governor of Newfoundland
John Elliot (physician) (1747–1787), English physician and scientist
John Elliot (brewer) (1765–1829), English brewer and officer of the Westminster Volunteer Cavalry
John Elliot (politician) (1788–1862), British politician
John Elliot (railway manager) (1898–1988), British transport and railway manager
John Elliot (songwriter) (1914–1972), American songwriter
John Elliot (author) (1918–1997), British novelist, screenwriter, and television producer

See also
John Eliot (disambiguation)
John Elliott (disambiguation)
Jonathan Elliot (disambiguation)